Orana is a fictional character who appears in comics produced by DC Comics. Orana is a red-haired Amazon who challenges and defeats Princess Diana for the title of Wonder Woman in WW issue #250 (December 1978). Orana adopts the self-imposed title as the "New Wonder Woman" and departs Paradise Island for New York City. She is killed in action shortly into her reign and allows Diana to reclaim the role as Wonder Woman.

Orana's appearance, mannerisms and storyline served as the inspiration for a future red haired Wonder Woman, Artemis.

Fictional character biography

Original prototype character
In Wonder Woman #98 (May. 1958) which is a retelling of Wonder Woman's origin, a red haired Amazon named Orana asks Queen Hippolyta if the queen will be fair during the judging of the tournament to determine who will become Wonder Woman. This Orana, however, displays none of the tendencies of the character that appears in Wonder Woman #250–254.

Primary character

"Tournament" – Wonder Woman #250 (1978)
Wonder Woman (Diana) receives an urgent message from her mother Queen Hippolyta to return home to Paradise Island. Once Diana arrives she is confronted by a red haired Amazon warrior named Orana who issues a challenge to the Princess' title as Wonder Woman. Diana protests the challenge but Queen Hippolyta informs her daughter that Orana has every right to call for a new tournament as per the laws laid down by the Gods of Olympus. The tournament is a four-day event and its format is based upon the four natural elements, earth, water, air and fire. In addition to Diana and Orana, every able bodied Amazon warrior signs up to compete for the title of Wonder Woman.

As the tournament progresses over four days Diana and Orana use their superior skills to easily overwhelm their fellow Amazon competitors. Though Diana and Orana rival each other physically, it is their individual personalities which set the two Amazon sisters apart. Orana is a brutal fighter who chooses to win by any means necessary. In contrast, Diana displays compassion during the tournament by rescuing other Amazons who become injured during the trials.

On the fourth and final day of the tournament only Diana and Orana remain in the competition. The rivals face off in the final event, a race on meteors in space. The red haired Amazon starts to pull away from Diana but Orana's efforts to win the race are not without unintended consequences. As Orana races across the meteors she inadvertently kicks the large space rocks through Earth's atmosphere, causing damage to the surface below. Diana realizes the danger and abandons the trial to focus saving the Earth. The Amazon princess masterfully kicks other meteors to deflect the ones that were headed towards Earth. Her efforts are successful but in doing so Diana allows Orana to win the race.

Queen Hippolyta commends Diana for her heroic actions and proclaims Diana the victor of the tournament. As a result, the Princess will retain her role as Wonder Woman. However upon returning to Paradise Island, the Gods of Mt. Olympus denounce Queen Hippolyta's decision and demand a change be made. The Gods argue that since Orana won the final trial, it is she who will become Wonder Woman.
Queen Hippolyta disputes the decision but Diana stops her mother's protest. She agrees to relinquish the title of Wonder Woman to Orana, rather than subject her mother to the wrath of the Gods. Diana presents Orana with the uniform of Wonder Woman, the magic lasso, tiara and the Invisible Plane. The Amazon princess urges her successor to use these tools wisely and to never falter in her role as Wonder Woman. Orana assures Diana that she will make the Amazon nation proud. The victorious Orana is carried off by a group of cheering Amazons while Diana and Queen Hippolyta console one another. Later a defeated Diana watches from the side as the young upstart races off to begin her mission as Wonder Woman. Silently she vows to follow Orana to the outside world even if it means angering the Gods themselves.

"The Name Is Wonder Woman" – Wonder Woman #251 (1979)
Orana, now calling herself the "New Wonder Woman", departs for New York City with dreams of becoming an even greater heroine than Diana. Unfortunately, Orana's temper and inexperience in the ways of the outside world derail her aspirations of glory. Soon after her arrival in the Big Apple, Orana is denied a hotel room after the staff fails to acknowledge her as Wonder Woman. Insulted after being called an impostor, Orana smashes the front desk in frustration. She screams back to the hotel staff that she is the "New Wonder Woman" and that everyone should learn that fact quickly. Later Orana attempts to capture a terrorist named Warhead. During her pursuit, Orana confronts police officers who are also chasing after Warhead and misinterprets the officers as a threat. In the confusion Warhead manages to escape leaving Orana shaken and humiliated.

Back on Paradise Island, Diana manages to steal an Amazonian rocket ship and makes her way back to New York City. However Diana's arrival has not gone unnoticed. A furious Orana tracks her down and bursts into Diana's apartment. Orana says only the Amazon chosen to serve as Wonder Woman has the right to leave Paradise Island. Diana says she only wants to continue her life in her alter ego of Diana Prince and will stay out of Orana's business. Diana also warns Orana not to come looking to her for help.

Orana confidently boasts that she can handle any threat even the terrorist known as Warhead. Diana instantly recognizes the name and warns Orana that Warhead's reason for being in New York could mean he's preparing to test a new weapon. Orana scoffs at Diana's concerns believing the Princess is trying to scare her. The ill-tempered Amazon departs and vows revenge against Diana for violating the gods' law and for trying to embarrass her.

High above New York City, Warhead's bomb thunders down from orbit towards its target, the Columbus Day parade. From her apartment, Diana scans the sky for any danger and to her surprise spots Orana on patrol in the invisible jet. Inside the cockpit, Orana grudgingly admits to herself that the Princess has had more experience in the outside world than her and that she must honor Diana's warning. Suddenly she spots Warhead's helicopter heading straight for her. The Amazon champion exits the cockpit and positions herself on the Invisible Plane's wing. There she comes under assault from gunfire by Warhead's henchmen. Orana deflects the bullets off her Amazonian bracelets but the attack is merely a diversion. Preoccupied with defending herself, Orana fails to notice Warhead's bomb thundering down through the clouds towards the city below.
 
From her apartment, Diana sees the incoming bomb and realizes she must act quickly to save New York and its citizens. The Amazon Princess springs into action, leaping across the roofs of the New York City skyscrapers. As she sprints to the scene of the battle, Diana thinks to herself, "I'm still Wonder Woman". After several tremendous leaps, Diana manages to catch the falling bomb in mid-air. Diana leaps onto the wing of the invisible jet and orders Orana to instruct the plane to go higher. An infuriated Orana ignores Diana's command and starts to argue with her. Suddenly an angry Warhead seizes a machine gun from one of his men and opens fire.
Orana fails to deflect the bullets in time and is struck by the gunfire. The red-haired beauty screams in agony and cries out to Diana, who can only watch in horror as her Amazon sister dies. Diana, now consumed by rage, hurls the bomb at Warhead's chopper, destroying the craft and saving New York City.

Following the battle, the Princess returns home to Paradise Island. Upon her arrival, Queen Hippolyta and the other Amazons bow their heads in sorrow as Diana climbs out of the invisible jet carrying Orana's lifeless body in her arms. Diana places her former rival in a tomb where she lays the "New Wonder Woman" to rest. Once the funeral ceremony has concluded, Diana is presented with a new costume, tiara and magic lasso, and reclaims her title as Wonder Woman.

Other appearances
Orana is briefly mentioned again in the following issue, as Queen Hippolyta contemplates whether the gods will punish Diana after Diana returned to the outside world after losing her title to Orana. Also in Wonder Woman #254, (April 1979) the gods on Mt. Olympus argue the circumstances in which Diana reclaimed her title. Mars says Diana left Paradise Island illegally and must be punished. Athena and Aphrodite object to the God of War, arguing that Orana had been killed therefore Diana rightfully reclaimed her title as Wonder Woman.

Powers and abilities
Orana is trained in high levels of hand-to-hand combat, but as Princess Diana noted during the tournament, Orana relies more on brute force than actual skill. Orana possesses super strength, tremendous leaping ability and high levels of endurance. Also like her fellow Amazons, she possessed the ability to glide on air currents. While she was Wonder Woman, she used the Lasso of Truth (though it was not called that at the time since its powers were not truth based). Orana is trained in the art of deflecting bullets with her bracelets, but is not nearly as proficient or disciplined as Princess Diana. Orana, like all the other amazons on Paradise Island, was blessed with eternal youth and great beauty. She lost her immunity from aging once she left the Island to become the "New Wonder Woman". Like all other Amazons from the Pre-Crisis era, Orana loses her powers if her wrists are bound by a man. If her bracelets are ever broken, she would fly into a berserk fury. In spite of her super-human abilities, Orana can be harmed by mortal weapons. In her first major battle as the "New Wonder Woman" she failed to protect herself from bullets shot at her and was killed.

In other media
Orana appears in the 2017 film Wonder Woman, portrayed by Mayling Ng. She is unnamed in the movie, but is credited as such (although only in the cast listings at Internet Movie Database). She aides the rest of the Amazons in battling the German soldiers on the beach of Themyscira. She is the first Amazon to be killed when she swings down on a rope attempting to fire her arrow only to be shot.

References

External links
Amazon Archives – Wonder Woman #250
Amazon Archives – Wonder Woman #251
Unofficial Guide to the DC Universe: Orana

Comics characters introduced in 1978
DC Comics Amazons
DC Comics characters with superhuman strength
DC Comics female superheroes
Fictional women soldiers and warriors
Fictional rope fighters
Wonder Woman characters